John Williams (born April 4, 1965) is an American equestrian, who competed as part of the US Eventing team at the 2004 Summer Olympics, winning the bronze medal.

Williams was born in Mendon, New York, and attended the Rochester Institute of Technology's School for American Craftsman, where he graduated after studying furniture design and woodworking.  Williams spent time after college in Middleburg, Virginia, and now resides in Southern Pines, North Carolina, with his wife, Ellen.

Williams has trained with many great eventers, including Jack Le Goff, James C. Wofford, and David and Karen O'Connor. Williams is also a recognized AHSA "R" Combined Training course designer, and designed the 2005 American Eventing Championship courses (novice to advanced).

Career highlights
2004
Olympic Games, bronze medal, individually 28th place (Carrick)

2002 
Team gold at the World Equestrian Games, individually 4th, Jerez, Spain
2nd Rolex Kentucky Three Day Event CCI**** (Carrick)
6th MBNA Foxhall Cup CCI*** (Sloopy)

2001
4th Morven Park Spring Horse Trials
12th Rolex Kentucky Three Day Event CCI**** (Carrick)

1999
Selected to compete in Olympic Test Event, Sydney, Australia

1998
5th Radnor CCI**

1997
Long-listed, European Championships

1996
2nd National Intermediate Championships, Radnor CCI**

1995
1st Mid-Atlantic Horse Trials Series
3rd National Intermediate Championships, Radnor CCI**, PA 3rd/

1994
3rd National Intermediate Championships, Radnor CCI**
Winner National DeBroke Championships
Long-listed, World Championships

1993
4th Rolex Kentucky Three Day Event, CCI***

1992
Long-listed, Olympic Games

1991
Pan American Games Three-Day Event Championship, Chatsworth, GA

1988
1st Intermediate CCI National Championship at Radnor

External links
About.com page
United States Olympic Committee web page
 Photo & more stats.

1965 births
People from Mendon, New York
Equestrians at the 2004 Summer Olympics
Living people
American male equestrians
American event riders
Rochester Institute of Technology alumni
Medalists at the 2004 Summer Olympics
Olympic bronze medalists for the United States in equestrian
People from Southern Pines, North Carolina